Mitiyativali River is a river in western India in Gujarat whose origin is Near Mitiyati village. Its basin has a maximum length of 20 km. The total catchment area of the basin is 165.75 km2.

References

Rivers of Gujarat
Kutch district
Rivers of India